This is a list of books which have been featured on BBC Radio 4's Book of the Week during 2012.

January 
 02-06 Looking for Transwonderland by Noo Saro-Wiwa, read by Janice Acquah.
The next five days featured a series of essays Stop What You're Doing and Read This comprising
 09 – Memories and Expectations by Michael Rosen, read by the author.
 10 – A Bed. A Book. A Mountain by Jeanette Winterson, read by the author.
 11 – Mindful Reading by Tim Parks, read by the author.
 12 – True Daemons by Carmen Callil, read by the author.
 13 – The Right Words in the Right Order by Mark Haddon, read by the author.
 16–20 – El Narco by Ioan Grillo, read by Rupert Degas.
 23–27 – A Shed of One's Own: Midlife without the Crisis by Marcus Berkmann, read by Toby Longworth.

February 
 30-03 – The Train in the Night: A Story of Music and Loss by Nick Coleman, read by Sean Foley
 06-10 – A Card from Angela Carter by Susannah Clapp, read by the author and Claire Skinner.
 13–17 – Europe in the Looking Glass by Robert Byron, read by Rupert Penry-Jones.
 20–24 – What the Grown-Ups Were Doing by Michele Hanson, read by Rebecca Front.

March 
 27-02 – Wilkie Collins by Peter Ackroyd, read by Michael Pennington.
 05-09 – Then They Came for Me by Maziar Bahari, read by Philip Arditti and Peter Hamilton Dyer.
 12–16 – 20 Letters to a Friend by Svetlana Alliluyeva, read by Stella Gonet.
 19–23 – Land's Edge – A Coastal Memoir by Tim Winton, read by Stephen Dillane.
 26–30 – Escape from Camp 14 by Blaine Harden, read by Kerry Shale.

April 
 02-06 – The Great Animal Orchestra by Bernie Krause, read by Nigel Lindsay.
 09-13 – Double Cross by Ben Macintyre, read by Jonathan Keeble.
 16–20 – Besieged: Life Under Fire in a Sarajevo Street by Barbara Demick, read by Laurel Lefkow.
 23–27 – Sightlines by Kathleen Jamie, read by Maureen Beattie.

May 
 29-04 – The Man within My Head by Pico Iyer, read by Paul Basely.
The next 5 days had a series of shorter fiction under the title Granta's Britain
 07 – Sugar in the Blood by Andrea Stuart, read by Lorraine Burroughs.
 08-09 – Stevenage by Gary Younge, read by David Harewood.
 10 – Theatre of Fortune by Nikolai Khalezin and Natalia Kaliada, read by Basher Savage.
 11 – The Magic Place by Kapka Kassabova, read by the author.
 14–18 – The Uke of Wallington by Mark Wallington, read by Hugh Dennis.
 21–25 – Hedge Britannia by Hugh Barker, read by Tim Key.
 28–32 – Midnight in Peking by Paul French, read by Crawford Logan.

June 
 04-08 – Strands by Jean Sprackland, read by the author.
 11–15 – Dear Lupin by Roger Mortimer, read by David Horovitch and Nicky Henson.
 18–22 – Beauty and the Inferno by Roberto Saviano, read by Nicholas Murchie.
 25–29 – Damn His Blood by Peter Moore, read by Alex Jennings.

July 
 02-06 – The Old Ways by Robert Macfarlane, read by Dan Stevens.
 09-13 – The Ecstasy of Influence by Jonathan Lethem, read by Kerry Shale.
 16–20 – Burying the Typewriter by Carmen Bugan, read by Anamaria Marinca.
 23–27 – Follow the Money by Steve Boggan, read by Ian Redford.

August 
 30-03 – Behind the Beautiful Forevers by Katherine Boo, read by Sudha Bhuchar.
 06-10 – Tubes: Behind the Scenes at the Internet by Andrew Blum, read by John Schwab.
 13–17 – Mrs Robinson's Disgrace by Kate Summerscale, read by Emma Fielding.
 20–24 – Thinking in Numbers by Daniel Tammet, read by James Anthony Pearson.
 27-01 – Leonardo and the Last Supper by Ross King, read by Nigel Anthony.

September 
 03-07 – Winter Journal by Paul Auster, read by Garrick Hagon.
 10–14 – Bring Me Sunshine by Charlie Connelly, read by Stephen Mangan.
 17–21 – Joseph Anton: A Memoir by Salman Rushdie, read by Zubin Varla.
 24–28 – Vanished Years by Rupert Everett, read by the author.

October 
 01-05 – Country Girl by Edna O'Brien, read by the author.
 08-12 – On The Map by Simon Garfield, read by the author.
 15–19 – Nancy: The Story of Lady Astor by Adrian Fort, read by Anna Maxwell Martin.
 22–26 – Into the Abyss by Carol Shaben, read by Barbara Barnes.
 29-02 – Tombstone by Yang Jisheng, read by David Yip.

November 
 05-09 – On Wheels by Michael Holroyd, read by the author.
 12–16 – Former People by Douglas Smith, read by Robert Powell.
 19–23 – Patrick Leigh Fermor: An Adventure by Artemis Cooper, read by Samuel West.
 26–30 – The Black Count by Tom Reiss, read by Hugh Quarshie.

December 
 03-07 – The Horologicon by Mark Forsyth, read by Hugh Dennis.
 10–14 – Looking for Mrs Livingstone by Julie Davidson, read by Tamara Kennedy.
 17–21 – Shakespeare's Local – Six Centuries of History Seen through One Extraordinary Pub by Pete Brown (writer), read by Tony Robinson.
 24–28 – Three Houses by Angela Thirkell, read by Sian Thomas.
 31-03 – Wild by Cheryl Strayed, read by Kelly Burke.

Lists of books
Lists of radio series episodes
British literature-related lists